Constantine's Bridge may refer to:

 Constantine's Bridge (Danube), a Roman bridge over the Danube
 Constantine's Bridge (Mysia), a Roman bridge in Mysia, modern-day Turkey
  ruins of a Roman bridge in Arles, France